Dunbar is a town in East Lothian, Scotland.

Dunbar may also refer to:

Places

Australia
Dunbar Station (Queensland)

Canada
Dunbar–Southlands, a residential neighborhood in Vancouver, Canada

United Kingdom
Dunbar Castle
Dunbar sands or Doom Bar, Cornwall

United States
East Dunbar, Fort Myers, Florida neighborhood
Dunbar, Georgia
Dunbar, Kentucky
Dunbar, Nebraska
Dunbar, Ohio
Dunbar, Oklahoma
Dunbar, Pennsylvania
Dunbar, Georgetown County, South Carolina
Dunbar, South Carolina, an unincorporated community in Marlboro County
Dunbar, Virginia
Dunbar, Wisconsin, a town
Dunbar (community), Wisconsin, an unincorporated community
Dunbar, West Virginia
Williamsburg, Michigan, an unincorporated community formerly called Dunbar
Dunbar Township, Fayette County, Pennsylvania

Other uses
Dunbar (novel), a novel by Edward St Aubyn
Dunbar (ship), a wrecked clipper, wrecked off Sydney
Dunbar (surname)
Allied Dunbar, a defunct British life insurance firm
Clan Dunbar
Dunbar Hotel and Club, Los Angeles

See also
Dunbar Theatre (disambiguation)
Dunbar's number, a value important in sociology and anthropology

Dumbarton (disambiguation)
Dumbarton (disambiguation)